Pentraeth Football Club is a Welsh football team based in Pentraeth, Anglesey, Wales. The team currently play in the North Wales Coast West Football League Premier Division, which is at the fourth tier of the Welsh football league system.

History
The club were Anglesey League champions in 2012–13, gaining promotion to the Gwynedd League for the 2013–14 season. They finished the season in ninth place before the following season joining the Welsh Alliance League Division Two.

At the end of the 2019–20 season which was curtailed by the COVID-19 pandemic, the club finished bottom of Division Two of the Welsh Alliance League with only three games played and were relegated.

The club joined the newly formed North Wales Coast Football League in the West Premier Division when announced in 2020.

Honours

Anglesey League – Champions: 2012–13
Welsh League North Division III - (Anglesey League) – Runners-up: 1953–54
Dargie Cup – Winners: 2012–13

External links
Official club website
Official club Twitter
Official club Facebook

References

Football clubs in Wales
Anglesey League clubs
Gwynedd League clubs
Welsh Alliance League clubs
North Wales Coast Football League clubs
Sport in Anglesey